Abantiades aphenges is a moth of the family Hepialidae, first described in 1904 by Alfred Jefferis Turner as Pielus aphenges. The specific epithet, aphenges, means "dark, gloomy". It is endemic to Australia, including New South Wales and Queensland.

References

Moths described in 1904
Hepialidae
Endemic fauna of Australia
Moths of Australia